Elections were held in the Niagara Region of Ontario on October 22, 2018, in conjunction with municipal elections across the province.

Niagara Regional Council

Regional Chair
For the first time, the chair of regional council was to be directly elected.  However, on the last day of candidate registration the Ontario Government announced they would be cancelling this council race.

At the time of this cancellation, five candidates were registered to run for he chair position. Incumbent chair Al Caslin and Pelham Mayor Dave Augstyn both decided to run for a regional council seat in their respective municipalities.

Fort Erie

Mayor

Regional Councillor

Fort Erie Town Council

Ward 1

Ward 2

Ward 3

Ward 4

Ward 5

Ward 6

Source:

Grimsby

Mayor

Source:

Lincoln

Mayor

Source:

Niagara Falls
Source:

Mayor

Regional Council
Three to be elected. Regional councillors do not sit in city council.

Niagara Falls City Council
8 to be elected at-large.

Niagara-on-the-Lake

Lord Mayor

Source:

Pelham

Mayor

Source:

Port Colborne

Mayor

Source:

St. Catharines

The 2018 St. Catharines municipal election took place on Monday October 22, 2018 to determine a mayor, regional and city councillors and school trustees in the city of St. Catharines, Ontario. The election of a regional chair was also scheduled, but was cancelled by the provincial government led by Premier Doug Ford on Friday July 27, 2018, the registration deadline for candidates.

Mayor

Source:

Regional Council
Six to be elected at-large. Regional councillors do not sit in city council.

Source:

St. Catharines City Council

Ward 1 - Merriton

Source:

Ward 2 - St. Andrew's

Source:

Ward 3 - St. George's

Source:

Ward 4 - St. Patrick's

Source:

Ward 5 - Grantham

Source:

Ward 6 - Port Dalhousie

Source:

Thorold

Mayor

Source:

Wainfleet

Mayor

Source:

Welland

Mayor

Source:

Regional Councillor
Two to be elected

Source:

Welland City Council

Two elected from each ward

Ward 1

Source:

Ward 2

Source:

Ward 3

Source:

By-election
A by-election was held on August 9, 2021, in Ward 3 to fill the vacancy of Lucas Spinosa who resigned.

Ward 4

Source:

Ward 5

Source:

Ward 6

Source:

West Lincoln

Mayor

Source:

References

External links

Municipal elections in St. Catharines
2018 Ontario municipal elections
Politics of the Regional Municipality of Niagara